The Juno Awards of 1981, representing Canadian music industry achievements of the previous year, were awarded on 5 February 1981 in Toronto at a ceremony hosted by multiple co-presenters at the O'Keefe Centre.  The first co-hosts were Andrea Martin and John Candy of SCTV fame, then Frank Mills and Ginette Reno, and finally Ronnie Hawkins and Carroll Baker.

Ceremonies were broadcast nationally on CBC Television from 7pm Eastern Time. More capacity was now available at the O'Keefe Centre and tickets were made available to the public at $15 each.  The television show was seen by an estimated 1,880,000 viewers .

Juno awards organiser CARAS announced the major nominees 6 January 1981, with additional nominees in classical, jazz and album graphics announced 20 January 1981.

The Emeralds, previously nominated four times for the Country Group award, were not nominated this year. Controversy ensued when a committee declared to CARAS that the band was a polka band that should not be nominated in a country category. A reported attempt to file their nomination in a folk category was rejected due to a relative lack of sales. The Emeralds then looked to the courts to stop CARAS from issuing ballots that omitted their group. The group's legal challenge was unsuccessful, but the settlement required the Juno awards to mention the band and its previous nominations during the broadcast.

Performers during the broadcast included Frank Mills on piano with Ginette Reno singing "The Poet and I", Ronnie Hawkins and Carrol Baker singing "Hey, Bo Diddley", Graham Shaw singing his hit "Can I Come Near", and single songs each from Diane Tell, Shari Ulrich and the Powder Blues Band.

Although she received four awards, Anne Murray was once again absent from this year's show. Joni Mitchell's entry into the Canadian Music Hall of Fame was introduced by then Prime Minister Pierre Trudeau. During her acceptance speech, Mitchell quipped that she felt like hockey star Bernie "Boom Boom" Geoffrion for receiving this honour.

The "Single of the Year" award was a tie between Anne Murray and Martha and the Muffins, and is the only time a tie for this award has occurred in the history of the Juno's.

Nominees and winners

Female Vocalist of the Year
Winner: Anne Murray

Other nominees:
 Carroll Baker
 Claudja Barry
 Susan Jacks
 Joni Mitchell

Male Vocalist of the Year
Winner: Bruce Cockburn

Other nominees:
 Burton Cummings
 Gordon Lightfoot
 Gino Vannelli
 Neil Young

Most Promising Female Vocalist of the Year
Winner: Carole Pope

Other nominees:
 Dianne Heatherington
 Michaele Jordana
 Shari Ulrich
 Laura Vinson

Most Promising Male Vocalist of the Year
Winner: Graham Shaw

Other nominees:
Bryan Adams
Long John Baldry
B. B. Gabor
Wayne Rostad

Group of the Year
Winner: Prism

Other nominees:
 April Wine
 Harlequin
 Max Webster
 Rush

Most Promising Group of the Year
Winner: Powder Blues Band

Other nominees:
Loverboy
Martha and the Muffins
Red Rider
Toronto

Composer of the Year
Winner: Eddie Schwartz, "Hit Me with Your Best Shot" by Pat Benatar

Other nominees:
 Doug Bennett, "Too Bad - The Move" by Doug and the Slugs
 Burton Cummings, "Fine State of Affairs"
 Mark Gane, "Echo Beach" by Martha and the Muffins
 Lindsay Mitchell, Allen Harlow, "Young and Restless" by Prism

Country Female Vocalist of the Year
Winner: Anne Murray

Other nominees:
 Carroll Baker
 Marie Bottrell
 Iris Larratt
 Laura Vinson

Country Male Vocalist of the Year
Winner: Eddie Eastman

Other nominees:
 Wilf Carter
 Dallas Harms
 Wayne Rostad
 Hank Snow

Country Group or Duo of the Year
Winner: The Good Brothers

Other nominees:
 Carlton Showband
 Family Brown
 R. Harlan Smith and Chris Nielsen
 6 Cylinder

Folk Artist of the Year
Winner: Bruce Cockburn

Other nominees:
 Gordon Lightfoot
 Murray McLauchlan
 The Rovers
 Valdy

Instrumental Artist of the Year
Winner: Frank Mills

Other nominees:
 Liona Boyd
 Hagood Hardy
 Moe Koffman
 Claire Lawrence

Producer of the Year
Winner: Gene Martynec, "Tokyo" by Bruce Cockburn and "High School Confidential" by Rough Trade

Other nominees:
 Bruce Fairbairn, "Young & Restless" and "Satellite", Prism
 Claire Lawrence, "Long Nights" and "Bad, Bad Girl", Shari Ulrich
 Jack Richardson, "Battle Scar", Max Webster and "Heads Are Gonna Roll", Straight Lines
 George Semkiw, "Hot Spikes" and "What Am I To Do", Fist

Recording Engineer of the Year
Winner: Mike Jones, "Factory" and "We're OK", Instructions

Other nominees:
Terry Brown, "Metropolitan Life", B. B. Gabor
Gary Gray, "What About the Bond", Bruce Cockburn and "High School Confidential", Carole Pope and Rough Trade
David Greene, "Battle Scar", Max Webster
Gord Paton, "The Invisible Man" and "Oh No", Zero One

Canadian Music Hall of Fame
Winner: Joni Mitchell

Nominated and winning albums

Album of the Year
Winner: Greatest Hits, Anne Murray

Other nominees:
 Permanent Waves, Rush
 Uncut, Powder Blues
 Woman Love, Burton Cummings
 Young and Restless, Prism

Best Album Graphics
Winner: Jeanette Hanna, We Deliver by Downchild Blues Band

Other nominees:
 Doug Bennett, Cognac and Bologna by Doug and the Slugs
 Dean Motter, Loverboy (self-titled)
 James O'Mara, Straight Lines (self-titled)
 Hugh Syme, Michael Gray, Lookin' for Trouble by Toronto

Best Children's Album
Winner: Singing 'n' Swinging, Sharon, Lois & Bram

Other nominees:
The Cat Came Back, Fred Penner
Listen To Me,  Jim & Rosalie
Merry-Go-Round,  The Travellers
You've Got To Be A Kid To Get In,  The Free Rose Corporation

Best Classical Album of the Year
Winner: Stravinsky - Chopin Ballads, Arthur Ozolins

Other nominees:
 Bach Toccatas, Vol 2, Glenn Gould
 The Village Band, Canadian Brass
 Orford String Quartet (self-titled)
 Francois Dompierre (self-titled)

International Album of the Year
Winner: The Wall, Pink Floyd

Other nominees:
 Against the Wind, Bob Seger
 Glass Houses, Billy Joel
 Greatest Hits, Kenny Rogers
 The Game, Queen

Best Jazz Album
Winner: Present Perfect, Rob McConnell & The Boss Brass

Other nominees:
 The Book of the Heart, Glen Hall
 Circles, Don Thompson
 Entre Amis, Bob Stroup
 Live in Jazz City, Bob Stroup
 Tommy Ambrose at Last, Tommy Ambrose with the Doug Riley Band

Nominated and winning releases

Single of the Year
Winner (tie):
 "Could I Have this Dance", Anne Murray
 "Echo Beach", Martha and the Muffins

Other nominees:
 "Fine State of Affairs", Burton Cummings
 "Too Bad - The Move", Doug and the Slugs
 "Wasn't That a Party", The Rovers

International Single of the Year
Winner: "Another Brick in the Wall (Part 2)", Pink Floyd

Other nominees:
 "Another One Bites the Dust", Queen
 "Funkytown", Lipps Inc.
 "It's Still Rock and Roll to Me", Billy Joel
 "Rapper's Delight", Sugar Hill Gang

References

Citations

General

Bibliography
 Krewen, Nick. (2010). Music from far and wide: Celebrating 40 years of the Juno Awards. Key Porter Books Limited, Toronto.

External links
Juno Awards site

1981
1981 music awards
1981 in Canadian music